Cocaine Cowboys may refer to:

Film
 Cocaine Cowboys (1979 film), a crime drama directed by Ulli Lommel
 Cocaine Cowboys (2006 film), a documentary
 Cocaine Cowboys 2, a 2008 sequel to the 2006 film
 Cocaine Cowboys: The Kings of Miami, a 2021 crime docuseries

Music
 "Cocaine Cowboys", a 1999 song by W.A.S.P. from the album Helldorado
 "Cocaine Cowboys", a 2012 song by Crashdïet from the album The Savage Playground
 "Cocaine Cowboys", a 2017 song by Margo Price from the album All American Made

See also
 Miami drug war